Rorvic Productions was a movie production company formed in 1956 by Rory Calhoun and Victor Orsatti. The name derives from the combination of the founders names, Rory and Victor.

Rorvic Productions produced the television series The Texan, three feature films, and two television films, all starring Calhoun.

The Hired Gun, released in 1957, was the first film produced by Rorvic Productions. Rorvic also produced Domino Kid (1957) and Apache Territory (1958).

Filmography

References 

Defunct film and television production companies of the United States
American companies established in 1956
Companies with year of disestablishment missing